WYMJ (99.5 FM, "Power Country 99.5") is a radio station licensed to serve New Martinsville, West Virginia.  The station is owned by the Dailey Corporation. It airs a country music format.

The station was assigned the WYMJ call letters by the Federal Communications Commission on February 13, 2001.

On November 7, 2011 WYMJ changed its format to country, branded as "Power Country 99.5".

Previous logo

References

External links

YMJ
YMJ
Wetzel County, West Virginia